Forestville is a ghost town in section 13 of Forestville Township in Fillmore County, Minnesota, United States. The nearest communities are Wykoff, to the northwest, and Preston, to the northeast.

History
The town of Forestville was settled in 1852 and organized in 1855, receiving this name in honor of Forest Henry, the first probate judge of Fillmore County. Henry settled in Forestville in 1854. The town was incorporated in 1891 and had a post office from 1855 until 1902.

Brothers-in-law William and Felix Meighen were some of the first settlers. Felix saw the need for a general store and stocked it with $700 worth of goods from Galena in October 1853. As more people arrived in Minnesota territory, the town gained a blacksmith shop, a cabinet shop, saw mills, farms, stores, grist mills and hotels.

The town's population began to drop after the railroad bypassed Forestville in 1868; many families began leaving for more prosperous areas. By 1880, the town's population was only 55 and most businesses had closed.  As families left town, the Meighen family began buying up cheap property, and by 1889, they owned the entire town and its surrounding area.  By the early 1900s, even the Meighen family had left Forestville, and their general store's doors were closed in 1910, marking the end of the town's life.

State Park
In 1949 the Minnesota State Legislature authorized the creation of Forestville State Park, with the intent to preserve what remained of the abandoned townsite.  Mystery Cave was added to the state park in 1987.

Today Historic Forestville is operated as a historic site of the Minnesota Historical Society.

Notes

External links
 Minnesota Historical Society: Historic Forestville

Federal architecture in Minnesota
Former municipalities in Minnesota
Former populated places in Fillmore County, Minnesota
Minnesota Historical Society
Ghost towns in Minnesota
Historic districts on the National Register of Historic Places in Minnesota
National Register of Historic Places in Fillmore County, Minnesota
Populated places on the National Register of Historic Places
Commercial buildings on the National Register of Historic Places in Minnesota